Minu District is a district (bakhsh) in Khorramshahr County, Khuzestan Province, Iran. At the 2006 census, its population was 7,582, in 1,562 families.  The district has one city: Minushahr. The district has one rural district (dehestan): Jazireh-ye Minu Rural District (Minu Island).

References 

Khorramshahr County
Districts of Khuzestan Province